The True North Centre for Public Policy is a Canadian conservative media outlet, advocacy organization, and registered charity. It operates the True North digital media arm.

History
In 1994, the Independent Immigration Aid Association was started with the goal of helping immigrants from the United Kingdom settle in British Columbia. According to Daniel Brown, a former director of the charity, a new board of directors took control of the charity in 2017 and renamed it the True North Centre for Public Policy. Control was handed off to three people: 
Kaz Nejatian, a former staffer for United Conservative Party leader Jason Kenney
William McBeath, the director of Training and Marketing for the right-wing Manning Centre for Building Democracy
Erynne Schuster, an Edmonton-based lawyer

Nejatian's wife, Candice Malcolm, describes herself as the "founder and Editor-In-Chief" of True North.

When the immigration-focused charity was transformed into a media and research organization, the change was scrutinized in the Canadian legal field. True North's filings with Canada Revenue Agency state that the organization runs "ongoing programs" that provide "support and assistance to UK immigrants to the Lower Mainland, Vancouver Island and the rest of British Columbia", that it has "new programs" dedicated to "research on immigration and integration", and that 100% of True North's programs put emphasis on "immigrant aid". However, the last available return filed with CRA was in 2017, and no new filings from the charity have been published since 2018.

Election debate access
During the 2019 federal election in Canada, True North was initially denied press access to the leaders' debate on the grounds that it was not a news outlet but an advocacy organization. True North argued that the decision to bar them was "unfair and arbitrary."

True North contested this decision to bar them, and brought the Leader's Debates Commission to court.The federal judge, Justice Russell Zinn, ruled in favour of True North, and forced the government to allow them to attend the debate and ask questions as journalists. The same year, Toula Drimonis described True North as "Fake news" in her editorial in Cult MTL.

Notable employees
In 2019, Canadian columnist Lindsay Shepherd joined True North as an investigative journalist.

In July 2021, Canadian conservative writer and political columnist Sue Ann Levy announced she was joining True North.

References

External links
 

Canadian news websites
Right-wing politics in Canada
Conservative media in Canada